Vanonus is a genus of ant-like leaf beetles in the family Aderidae. There are about 16 described species in Vanonus.

Species
These 16 species belong to the genus Vanonus:

 Vanonus aestiorum Alekseev & Grzymala, 2015
 Vanonus balteatus Werner, 1990
 Vanonus brevicornis (Perris, 1869)
 Vanonus brunnescens (Fall, 1901)
 Vanonus calvescens Casey, 1895
 Vanonus huronicus Casey, 1895
 Vanonus macrops Werner, 1990
 Vanonus musculus Werner, 1990
 Vanonus oklahomensis Werner, 1990
 Vanonus piceus (LeConte, 1855)
 Vanonus sagax Casey, 1895
 Vanonus ulmerigicus Alekseev & Grzymala, 2015
 Vanonus uniformis Werner, 1990
 Vanonus valgus Werner, 1990
 Vanonus vigilans Casey, 1895
 Vanonus wickhami Casey, 1895

References

Further reading

External links

 

Aderidae
Articles created by Qbugbot